William Joseph Raftery (born April 19, 1943) is an American basketball analyst and former college basketball coach.

High school and college years
Raftery attended Saint Cecilia High School in Kearny, New Jersey, where he starred in basketball and became the all-time leading scorer in state history with 2,192 points, a record finally surpassed after 35 years. He earned all-state honors in basketball and led his team to the state championship in his senior season. He was also named all-state in baseball and soccer. He has been named, retroactively, Mr. Basketball USA for 1959.

Raftery played at La Salle University under coach Donald "Dudey" Moore. During his freshman year he scored a freshman record 370 points, followed by a team leading 17.8 points per game in his sophomore year. As a senior, he co-captained the Explorers to the National Invitation Tournament.

Following his senior year at La Salle, Raftery was selected in the 14th round (82nd overall) of the 1963 NBA draft by the New York Knicks but never played in the NBA.

Coaching career
Raftery began his coaching career at Fairleigh Dickinson University at Madison (now in Florham Park, New Jersey) where he was the head basketball coach from 1963 to 1968. Also, Raftery coached golf and served as associate athletic director.

From 1970 to 1981, he was the head coach of Seton Hall University, where he posted a 154–141 record and led the Pirates to four ECAC post-season tournaments and two National Invitational Tournament appearances. In 1979, he was named Coach of the Year by the New Jersey Sports Writers Association. His 154 wins as a coach places him fifth on the all-time list at Seton Hall behind Honey Russell, P. J. Carlesimo, Frank Hill, and Kevin Willard.

Head coaching record

Broadcasting career

Raftery has served as an analyst and color commentator for CBS Sports' college basketball coverage since 1983. During CBS' coverage of March Madness, Raftery frequently partnered with Verne Lundquist. Starting with the 2014–15 collegiate basketball season, CBS/Turner Sports partnered Raftery with Jim Nantz and Grant Hill to make up the primary announcing team for the remainder of the regular season, all the way through the NCAA men's basketball tournament and the Final Four.

Raftery was also an analyst with ESPN, primarily partnered with Sean McDonough and Jay Bilas and formerly Mike Gorman for Big East games. He has served as an analyst for CBS Radio/Westwood One's coverage of the NCAA Men's Final Four along with Kevin Kugler and John Thompson.

Raftery was also the lead analyst for the New Jersey Nets (prior to the franchise's move to Brooklyn) for over 20 years until 2002 and was an on-course commentator for PGA Tour Champions Tour events. Raftery while at CBS also worked as an analyst for select NBA games, paired with Brent Musburger and Dick Stockton.

On June 27, 2013, Raftery signed with Fox Sports to call Big East basketball games on the upstart network Fox Sports 1 with Gus Johnson.

His trademark quotes include: "Onions!" (when a shot is made late in a close game), "Send it in big fella!" (when a post player makes a slam dunk), "With a little kiss!" (when a shot banks in, usually in a nonstandard way), "A little nickel-dimer!" (when a light foul is called), "Get the puppies organized!" (in reference to good footwork), and "A little lingerie on the deck!" (when a player makes a nifty move with the ball and fakes out the defender).

Another phrase Raftery is known for is "Man-to-man!", which he announces very fast and excitedly at the start of most games. He is especially remembered for "Send It In, Jerome!", his call immediately after Jerome Lane of the University of Pittsburgh shattered the backboard with a powerful dunk during a 1988 game.

Awards and honors
2006 Curt Gowdy Media Award
NSSA Hall of Fame inductee (class of 2015)
Four-time Sports Emmy Award winner for Outstanding Sports Event Analyst

Other ventures
Aside from his commentating duties, Raftery was also the president of W.J. Raftery Associates, an event/marketing firm.

Personal life
Born William Joseph Raftery in Orange, New Jersey, Bill Raftery grew up in an Irish Catholic family with Irish immigrant parents. His sister is a nun. Raftery earned a B.A. in history from La Salle University in 1963 and an M.A.E. in education from Seton Hall University in 1966. In 2001, he received an honorary doctorate from La Salle.

Raftery lives in Florham Park, New Jersey with his wife, Joan, and has four children and five grandchildren. His son, Billy, produced and narrated a documentary about his father's life in basketball entitled With a Kiss. The documentary premiered hours before the longtime broadcaster called his second Final Four as a television analyst for CBS Sports.

References

External links

1943 births
Living people
American men's basketball coaches
American men's basketball players
American television sports announcers
Basketball coaches from New Jersey
Basketball players from New Jersey
College basketball announcers in the United States
College men's basketball head coaches in the United States
Golf writers and broadcasters
La Salle Explorers men's basketball players
National Basketball Association broadcasters
New Jersey Nets announcers
New York Knicks draft picks
Parade High School All-Americans (boys' basketball)
People from Florham Park, New Jersey
People from Orange, New Jersey
Seton Hall Pirates men's basketball coaches
Seton Hall University alumni
Guards (basketball)